Eduart Tanushaj, also spelled Eduart Tanushi, (born 20 June 1983 in Laç) is an Albanian retired footballer who last played as a forward for Adriatiku Mamurrasi in the Albanian First Division.

As of 2018, he works with the Laçi U-19 team.

References

External links
 Profile - FSHF
 
 

1983 births
Living people
People from Laç
Albanian footballers
Association football forwards
KF Laçi players
KS Kastrioti players
KS Burreli players
KS Pogradeci players
KF Adriatiku Mamurrasi players
Kategoria Superiore players
Kategoria e Parë players